Association sportive de Béziers was a French association football team playing in the city of Béziers, Hérault. The team was founded in 1911 and was dissolved in 1990, due to financial problems. The team was the football section of successful rugby club AS Béziers Hérault.

Honours
 Played in Ligue 1 in the 1957–58 season

Managerial history
Source:

References

External links
 History

Association football clubs established in 1911
Association football clubs disestablished in 1990
Defunct football clubs in France
1911 establishments in France
1990 disestablishments in France
Sport in Béziers
AS Béziers Hérault (football)
Football clubs in Occitania (administrative region)
Ligue 1 clubs